The 2011 WAFL Grand Final was an Australian rules football game contested between the Claremont Football Club and the Subiaco Football Club, on 25 September 2011 at Patersons Stadium, to determine the premier team of the West Australian Football League (WAFL) for the 2011 season. Claremont won the game by 56 points, 19.13 (127) to 10.11 (71), with Beau Wilkes of Claremont winning the Simpson Medal as best on ground. The attendance of 15,459 was the lowest since 8,991 people attended the 1944 Grand Final.

Lead-up to the grand final
The two teams had previously met twice in the season, with Claremont winning both encounters.

Claremont
The club won eight of their first ten matches.

Subiaco
The club won only three of their first ten matches, but drew back later in the season to win nine of their last ten matches, including the first semi-final, against , and preliminary final, against .

Teams

Claremont

Subiaco

Match

References

West Australian Football League Grand Finals
WAFL